Huntingdon Area Senior High School  is a public high school, located in Huntingdon Borough, Pennsylvania, that educates about 800 students in grades  in the Huntingdon Area School District.

History
The current school, located at 2400 Cassady Ave., was dedicated on January 15, 1961. The former high school was located at the corner of 10th and Moore streets in Huntingdon.

Vocational opportunities
Students in grades 10–12 at Huntingdon Area High School have the opportunity to attend the Huntingdon County Career and Technology Center, located in Mill Creek, Pennsylvania.

References

External links
 Huntingdon Area High School 
 School Performance Profile: Huntingdon Area Senior High School

Buildings and structures in Huntingdon County, Pennsylvania
Schools in Huntingdon County, Pennsylvania
Educational institutions established in 1961
Public high schools in Pennsylvania
Huntingdon, Pennsylvania
1961 establishments in Pennsylvania